This is a list of fictional dogs in prose and poetry and is a subsidiary to the list of fictional dogs. It is a collection of various dogs in prose literature and poetry.

Prose and poetry

Bibliography

Footnotes

References

Lists of fictional canines
Fictional dogs